The hair cuticle is the outermost part of the hair shaft. It is formed from dead cells, overlapping in layers, which form scales that strengthen and protect the hair shaft. While the cuticle is the outermost layer, it is not responsible for the color of the hair. Melanin is the pigment that gives hair its color and is found in the cortex.

References

Hair anatomy